Putthinan Wannasri (born September 5, 1992), simply known as Aon, is a Thai professional footballer who plays as a defender for Thai League 1 club Bangkok United and the Thailand national team.

International career
Putthinan debuted for Thailand against China, in a friendly match which Thailand won 5-1. In May 2015, he was called up to Thailand to play in the 2018 FIFA World Cup qualification (AFC) against Vietnam.

Honours

International
Thailand
 King's Cup (1): 2017

References

External links
Putthinan Wannasri profile at the Bangkok United website

1992 births
Living people
Putthinan Wannasri
Putthinan Wannasri
Association football fullbacks
Putthinan Wannasri
Putthinan Wannasri
Putthinan Wannasri
Putthinan Wannasri
Putthinan Wannasri
Putthinan Wannasri
Putthinan Wannasri